Matali Crasset, born on July 28, 1965 in Châlons-en-Champagne, is a French Industrial designer.

Biography 
Matali Crasset was born on July 28, 1965 in Chalons-en-Champagne into a family of farmers. She spent her childhood in the small village of Normée. In 1988, she decided to continue her studies in Paris at the ENSCI (Ecole Nationale Supérieure de Création Industrielle) and obtained her diploma as an industrial designer in 1991. She joined Denis Santachiara's studio in Milan in 1992 for a year, before joining Philippe Starck's studio in Paris in 1993, where she was appointed head of the Thomson Multimedia project, then Tim Thom, Thomson's design center. This collaboration lasted four years during which Matali Crasset developed under the direction of Philippe Starck "everyday objects at the service of people". Matali Crasset has defined Philippe Starck as a complex personality in whom she admires the ability to free himself from constraints. Nevertheless, 1998 saw her creating her own company with her husband Francis Fichot, to "protect herself from Starck".

Matali Crasset lives and works in Paris. She is the mother of two children, Popline and Arto.

In 2011 and 2016, she is a guest of honour at the Festival international du livre d'art et du film.

She was one of the artists selected by Brigitte Macron in 2017 for the redevelopment and decoration of the Elysée Palace.

Selected personal exhibitions

Works 
Matali Crasset's creations are present in many public collections in France, Centre Pompidou, Musée des arts décoratifs of Paris National Centre for Plastic Arts, Fonds municipal d'art contemporain de la Ville de Paris, FRAC Nord Pas de Calais, Consortium Museum, and in many international institutions, MoMA, Art Institute of Chicago, Mudac in Lausanne (Switzerland), Indianapolis Museum of Art, Grand Hornu (Belgium), MAK Vienna (Austria).

Research 

 MIXtree Salon d'interface musicale, 2005, Centre Georges Pompidou
 Easy China, Frac Nord-Pas-de-Calais, 2005

Scenography of contemporary art exhibitions 

 Superwarhol, curator : Germano Celant, Grimaldi Forum, Monaco,2003
 Printemps de septembre, Chill out, Toulouse, 2003
 Salon de Montrouge, curator : Stéphane Corréard, depuis 2009
 Expositions fleuves, Cneai, Chatou, 2009

Scenography of concerts 

 Pierre Lapointe, Amours, délices et orgues, 2017

Architecture 

 Le Nichoir (2011) et La Noisette (2012), Woodland houses, public commission, Le Vent des forêts, Meuse.
 Le pigeonnier Capsule, Caudry leisure centre, 2003. Work carried out as part of the Fondation de France's Nouveaux commanditaires. 
 Hi Hotel, Nice, 2003
 SM's, musée d'arts décoratifs et d'art contemporain, s'Herogenbosch, 2005
 HI beach, Hi hôtel, Nice
 Tout'ouvert, Nice), 2006
 Les pastilles Restaurant , Cap 3000, Saint Laurent du Var, 2009
 Nouvel Odéon, cinema, Paris, 2009
 Ménagerie de Verre, Paris, 2009
 Maison des Petits, Cent quatre, Paris, 2009
 DAR HI, ecolodge, Nefta, Tunisia, 2010
 Hi Matic Hôtel, Paris, 2011
 Sledge house, Nice, 2011
 Petit salon de la maison des Petits, Cent quatre, Paris, 2013

Objects 
Matali Crasset works with international publishers, Alessi, Campeggi, Danese, Domeau & Péres, Le Buisson, Ikea, Plust.

 Din Set, 2005
 Evolute, lamp, Danese, 2004
 Sac Nido, bag, 2006
 City brunch, 2004
 Okaidi, children's clothing collection in 2013 and 2014
 PS tray, Ikea, 2014
 We trust in wood, 2015
 Vino sospeso, Bordeaux, 2019

Furniture 

 Quand Jim monte à Paris, Photo, Domeau & Pérès, 1995
 Permis de construire sofa,Domeau & Péres 2000
 Téo de 2 à 3, Domeau & Pérès, 1998
 Concentré de vie, sofa, Campeggi
 PS Wardrobe, Ikea, 2014

Décorations 

 Ordre des Arts et des Lettres: Commander, 31 août 2018
 Ordre national du Mérite: Knight, 16 May 2008
 Legion of Honour: Knight, 14 April 2017

Bibliography 

 Jean-Pierre Delarge, Dictionnaire des arts plastiques modernes et contemporains, Paris, Gründ, 2001 [lire en ligne]
 
 
 
 
 
 
 Choi, Leeji. "Matali Crasset Interview." Designboom | Architecture & Design Magazine, September 20, 2013, www.designboom.com/interviews/matali-crasset-designboom-interview/.
 Chronopoulos, George. "Exclusive Interview with Matali Crasset." Delood, November 21, 2011, www.delood.com/design/exclusive-interview-matali-crasset.
 Crasset, Matali. "Matali Crasset." Matali Crasset, www.matalicrasset.com/. "Interview: Matali Crasset.” La Revue Du Design, November 10, 2010, www.larevuedudesign.com/2010/11/10/interview-designer-matali-crasset/.
 Leff, Cathy. “Matali Crasset's Intentional Design.” Cultured Magazine, March 7, 2018, www.culturedmag.com/matali-crassets-intentional-design/.

Filmography 

 Dar-Hi by Matali Crasset, documentary film, Christophe Dumoulin and David Haremza, 2013.film-documentaire.fr
 matali crasset : le design ludique et politique, documentary film, Rémy Batteault, (France 5 November 9, 2019).

References

External links 

 

Chevaliers of the Légion d'honneur
Knights of the Ordre national du Mérite
Commandeurs of the Ordre des Arts et des Lettres
French industrial designers
Product designers
1965 births
Living people